Bururi Forest Nature Reserve is a nature reserve in southwestern Burundi. Created in 1951, it is designated a wilderness area (IUCN protected area category Ib).

Its area is 33 km. It is managed by the Institute National pour l’ Environment et la Conservation de la nature (INECN).

The annual rainfall is from 1200mm to 2400mm.

There are 93 species of trees in the Bururi Forest, with Strombosia and Myrianthus spp. dominant and Tabernaemontana, Newtonia, and Entandrophragma spp. also common.

87 bird species have also been registered, including Apalis argentea which is common in some areas.

References

Protected areas of Burundi
Protected areas established in 1951
1951 establishments in Africa
Bururi Province
1951 establishments in Ruanda-Urundi
Albertine Rift montane forests
Central Zambezian miombo woodlands